Sarcoramphus is a genus of New World vulture that contains a single extant species, the king vulture (Sarcoramphus papa).

Extinct members of the genus include the Kern vulture (Sarcoramphus kernense) from the mid-Pliocene of North America, and Sarcoramphus fisheri from the Late Pleistocene of Peru. 

A hypothetical species known as the painted vulture is also assigned to this genus, but no concrete proof of its existence has been found as of yet.

References
 

Cathartidae
Bird genera
Bird genera with one living species